EYA may refer to:

 EYA1 gene and protein
 EYA2 gene and protein
 EYA4 gene and protein
 Eyak language, by ISO 639 code
 Eya Laure, Filipina volleyball player